Modesto Francisco Fernández Díaz-Silveira (Havana, 1946) is a Cuban government official that travels often around the world talking about the environment.

He in an Investigator of the Instituto de Investigaciones Fundamentales para la Agricultura Tropical (INIFAT)in the Cuban Ministry of Agriculture. He was a member of the United Nations Forum on Forests (UNFF) held in 2003. He has spoken various times at the International Institute for Sustainable Development (IISD) in Canada.

He got his undergraduate degree in Agricultural Engineering, and his doctorate in Agricultural Sciences from the University of Havana. He is the son of Modesto Fernández-Roseñada and Lydia Díaz-Silveira López and the grandson of Francisco Díaz-Silveira. His second cousin is Francisco Díaz-Silveira Tamargo, an anti-Castro Cuban militant.

References

 IISD article
 Earth Negotiations Bulletin, Vol. 9 No. 365 First Session of the Governing Body of the ITPGR #2 MONDAY, 12 JUNE 2006
 Biosafety Clearing-House bio

Published works
 Fernández, M. (1966): Plant parasitic nematodes, their economic importance in Cuba. Dir. Nac. Ext. y Experim. Agrícola, La Habana, Cuba, 7 pp.
 Tulaganov, A., Baranovskaya, I., Turliguina, E. y Fernández, M. (1966): Cuban Nematodes. Proceedings of the First Latin American Colloquium on Soil Biology. UNESCO. Bahía Blanca, Argentina. pp:182-189.
 Fernández, M. (1967): Lista de nemátodos de Cuba. Revista de Agricultura 1(2):74-88.
 Fernández, M. (1970): Lista de nemátodos fitoparásitos de Cuba (2da Contribución:122 plantas). Serie Agrícola No. 16, Acad. de Ciencias de Cuba, 29pp.
 Fernández M., and P.T.Mijailova (1973): Los nemátodos y su relación con la pudrición del cogollo del cocotero en Cuba. Serie Agrícola No. 29, Acad. de Ciencias de Cuba, 10pp.
 Fernández, M. (1975):  3(3):80-85.
 Fernández, M., Razjivin, A., Ortega, J., and Quincosa, A. (1979): Presencia en Cuba de tres especies de nemátodos asociadas al arroz. Ciencias de la Agricultura 4:176-177.
 Fernández, M., Razjivin, A., Ortega, J., and Quincosa, A. (1980): New Helicotylenchus (Nematoda:Hoplolaiminae) species, associated to rice crop in  en Cuba. Poeyana 202:1-27.
 Razjivin, A., Fernádez, M., Ortega, J., and Quincosa A. (1981): New Hirschmanniella (Nematoda:Pratylenchinae) species, as parasites of weeds on rice plantations. Poeyana 216:1-11.
 Fernández, M., and Ortega, J. (1981): Especies de nemátodos encontradas en arroz en Cuba. Ciencias de la Agricultura 9:121.
 Fernández, M., and Ortega, J. (1981): Plantas indeseables como hospedantes de los nemátodos parásitos del arroz. Ciencias de la Agricultura 12:114-116.
 Fernández, M., and Ortega, J. (1982): Comportamiento de las poblaciones de nemátodos fitoparásitos en plátano Enano Cavendish. Ciencias de la Agricultura 13:7-17.
 Fernández, M., and Ortega, J. (1982): Nuevos hospedantes para Rotylenchulus reniformis. Ciencias de la Agricultura 13:121.
 Fernández, M., and Ortega, J. (1983): Distribución de los nemátodos fitoparásitos en zonas arroceras de Cuba. I. Provincia de Pinar del Río. Ciencias de la Agricultura 14:25-35.
 Fernández, M., and Ortega, J. (1983):  14:37-44.
 Fernández, M., and Ortega, J. (1983): Distribución de los nemátodos fitoparásitos en zonas arroceras de Cuba. II. Provincia de Matanzas. Ciencias de la Agricultura 16:15-22.
 Zambrana, T., Díaz, S., Fernández, M., and Díaz, H. (1984): La soya y la posibilidad de su producción en Cuba. Folleto de la Direcc. Agrícola de la Acad. de Ciencias de Cuba.
 Schliephake, E., Fernández, M., and Ortega, J. (1985): Helicotylenchus paraconcavus sp. n. (Nematoda:Hoplolaiminae), and the description of a Helicotylenchus microcephalus male. Sher, 1966. Poeyana 295:1-5.
 Fernández, M., and Ortega, J. (1985): Distribución de los nemátodos fitoparásitos en zonas arroceras de Cuba. Ciencias de la Agricultura 23:25-30.
 Fernández, M., and Ortega, J. (1986):  Enano Cavendish. Reporte de Investigación del INIFAT 27:1-20.
 Fernández, M., Ortega, J., Heyer, W., and Cruz, B. (1986): Mejora de un método para la detección de huevos de Empoasca fabae y Agromyza sp. en plántulas de frijol. Ciencias de la Agricultura 26:41-45.
 Fernández, M., Ortega, J., and Díaz, H. (1986):  Ciencias de la Agricultura 26:23-34.
 Fernández, M., and Ortega, J. (1986): Posibilidad de la sucesión de cultivos soya-tabaco respecto a los fitonemátodos. II. Las plantas indeseables como reservorio natural de nemátodos. Ciencias de la Agricultura 27:39-42.
 Fernández, M., and Ortega, J. (1986): Consideraciones sobre la determinación de Meloidogyne incognita del suelo por medio de plantas indicadoras. Ciencias de la Agricultura 27:18-24.
 Pérez, M.A., Fernández, M., Ortega, J., and González, J. (1986): Relación de los nemátodos Meloidogyne incognita y Rotylenchulus reniformis con el hongo Rhizoctonia solani en la soya. Ciencias de la Agricultura 29:32-38.
 Fernández M., and Ortega, J. (1986): Lista de nemátodos fitoparásitos de Cuba. Editorial Científico-Técnica, La Habana, Cuba. 76pp.
 Fernández, M., Ortega, J., and Berbe, F. (1987): Posibilidad de la rotación soya-arroz respecto a los fitonemátodos. Ciencias de la Agricultura 31:14-18.
 Fernández, M. (1987): Los fitonemátodos en el cultivo del arroz, en las provincias occidentales de Cuba. Tesis para obtener el Doctorado en Ciencias Agrícolas (Ph.D.). Academia de Ciencias de Cuba, 133 pp.
 Fernández, M., Ortega, J., and Medina, P. (1989):  Ciencias de la Agricultura 36:20-28.
 Fernández, M., Ortega, J., Martínez, R., and Medina P. (1989):  Ciencias de la Agricultura 36:15-19.
 Ortega, J., and Fernández, M. (1989): Parasitismo de nemátodos en plantas ornamentales. Ciencias de la Agricultura 36:152.
 Fernández, M., and Ortega, J. (1989):  Proceedings of the IV International Conference on Soybean Research, Buenos Aires, Argentina.
 Díaz, H., Velazquez, O., González, J., Busto, I., Fernández, M., and Ortega, J. (1992): El cultivo de la soya para granos y forrajes. Centro de Información y Documentación Agropecuaria. MINAGRI, La Habana, pp:1-16.
 Fernández, M. and Ortega, J. (1995). Main nematological problems in Cuba. Proceedings of the International Congress on Tropical Nematology, Rio Quente, Goias, Brasil (June 4–9, 1995), pp:162-171.
 Fernández, M., and Ortega, J. (in press): Rotación de la soya con sorgo en una zona ganadera de Pinar del Río. Ciencias de la Agricultura.
 Delgado, E., Fernández, M., Pérez, L., and Ortega, J. (in press): Alteraciones metabólicas de las enzimas peroxidasas y polifenoloxidasas, producidas por Meloidogyne incognita en la soya. Agrotecnia de Cuba.
 Delgado, E., Fernández, M., Pérez, L., and Ortega, J. (in press): Actividad de la fenilalanina amonioliasa y su relación con la acumulación de fitoalexinas en soya infestada con Meloidogyne incognita. Agrotecnia de Cuba.
 Fernández, M. (co-author) (1996): National report on Biodiversity of the Republic of Cuba. Edited jointly by Cuban Environmental Agency and United Nations Environmental Programme (UNEP).
 Fernández, M. (1997). “Politica Ambiental Cubana. Reflexiones para un Desarrollo Sostenible”. Cuba Socialista magazine (3) 6:2-14.
 Fernández M. (Co-author). Cuban National Environmental Strategy. Ministry of Science, Technology and Environment. Cuba.27 pp.
 Cuba (1997): Law 81/97 Cuban Environmental Law. Gaceta de Cuba. (Dr. Fernandez was part of the group of authors that proposed the Law that was already passed by the Cuban National Assembly).
 Team of authors (Co-author) 1998: Environmental Strategy for Cuban Agriculture. Ministry of Agriculture. Cuba.
 Team of authors (Co-author) 1999: Draft of the National Law on Biological Diversity. Ministry of Science, Technology and Environment.
 Fernández, M. (1999): “Politica Ambiental Cubana. Reflexiones para un Desarrollo Sostenible”. In: “Cuba Verde. EN busca de un modelo para la sustentabilidad en el Siglo XXI”. Pp:370-380. Edit. José Martí, La Habana.
 Fernández, M. (2002): “Preservando la Montaña”. In “Ciencia, Innovación y Desarrollo” 7(2),:19-22.

Government ministers of Cuba
Living people
1946 births
Cuban diplomats